Hydro is a town in Caddo and Blaine counties in the U.S. state of Oklahoma. As of the 2010 census, the town population was 969.

History
The town was founded on August 6, 1901. Built near the Choctaw, Oklahoma and Gulf Railroad, the settlement was originally called "Caddo", but when the post office was established in September 1901, the name was changed to "Hydro" in reference to the town's plentiful well water.

Geography
A small part of the town extends north into Blaine County.

I-40 leads west  to Weatherford and east  to downtown Oklahoma City.

Demographics

 
As of the census of 2000, there were 1,060 people, 413 households, and 280 families residing in the town. There were 466 housing units at an average density of 770.4 per square mile (299.9/km2). The racial makeup of the town was 91.32% White, 0.19% African American, 3.58% Native American, 0.19% Asian, 0.28% Pacific Islander, 1.89% from other races, and 2.55% from two or more races. Hispanic or Latino of any race were 4.53% of the population.

There were 413 households, out of which 31.5% had children under the age of 18 living with them, 51.8% were married couples living together, 10.7% had a female householder with no husband present, and 32.2% were non-families. 29.1% of all households were made up of individuals, and 11.6% had someone living alone who was 65 years of age or older. The average household size was 2.42 and the average family size was 2.98.

In the town, the population was spread out, with 24.1% under the age of 18, 9.7% from 18 to 24, 23.9% from 25 to 44, 20.8% from 45 to 64, and 21.5% who were 65 years of age or older. The median age was 39 years. For every 100 females, there were 84.7 males. For every 100 females age 18 and over, there were 83.4 males.

The median income for a household in the town was $27,235, and the median income for a family was $31,071. Males had a median income of $26,645 versus $17,308 for females. The per capita income for the town was $13,256. About 14.4% of families and 18.0% of the population were below the poverty line, including 23.6% of those under age 18 and 10.1% of those age 65 or over.

Notable people
 Minnie Lou Bradley, matriarch of the Bradley 3 Ranch in the Texas Panhandle, grew up near Hydro.
 Lucille Hamons, a Route 66 icon dubbed "The Mother of the Mother Road."

See also
National Register of Historic Places listings in Caddo County, Oklahoma
 Bridgeport Hill-Hydro OK 66 Segment of U.S. Route 66 in Oklahoma
 Provine Service Station

References

External links
 Encyclopedia of Oklahoma History and Culture - Hydro

Towns in Caddo County, Oklahoma
Towns in Oklahoma
Towns in Blaine County, Oklahoma